William G. Nicholson was a Scottish professional football outside left who made over 260 appearances in the Scottish League for Queen's Park and Rangers.

Honours 
Rangers
 Scottish League First Division (3): 1929–30, 1933–34, 1934–35
 Scottish Cup (1): 1933–34

References

Year of birth missing
Scottish footballers
Scottish Football League players
Queen's Park F.C. players
Place of death missing
Date of death missing
Association football outside forwards
Rangers F.C. players
Scottish Football League representative players
Scotland amateur international footballers
St Johnstone F.C. players
Footballers from Glasgow